The Pekao Szczecin Open is a professional tennis tournament played on outdoor clay courts. It is currently part of the Association of Tennis Professionals (ATP) Challenger Tour. It is held annually at the Wojska Polskiego in Szczecin, Poland, since 1993  (as a Satellite from 1993 to 1995, as a Challenger since 1996).

Past finals

Key

Singles

Doubles

External links
Official website
ITF Search

 
ATP Challenger Tour
Tretorn SERIE+ tournaments
Clay court tennis tournaments
Tennis tournaments in Poland
Sport in Szczecin